Manduca feronia is a moth of the  family Sphingidae. It is known from Brazil.

References

Manduca
Moths described in 1962